Sośnica  is a village in the administrative district of Gmina Radymno, within Jarosław County, Podkarpackie Voivodeship, in south-eastern Poland, close to the border with .

References

Villages in Jarosław County